Sodium dichloroisocyanurate (INN: sodium troclosene, troclosenum natricum or NaDCC or SDIC) is a chemical compound widely used as a cleansing agent and disinfectant.  It is a colorless, water-soluble solid, produced as a result of reaction of cyanuric acid with chlorine. The dihydrate is also known as is the potassium salt.

Uses 
It is mainly used as a disinfectant, biocide and industrial deodorant. It is found in some modern water purification tablets/filters. It is more efficient than the formerly used halazone water disinfectant. In these applications, it is a slow-release source of chlorine in low concentrations at a relatively constant rate.  As a disinfectant, it is used to sterilize drinking water, swimming pools, tableware and air, and to fight against infectious diseases as a routine disinfection agent.

It can be used for disinfection and environmental sterilization, for example in  livestock, poultry, fish and  silkworm raising, for bleaching textiles, for cleaning industrial circulating water, and to prevent wool from shrinking. 

The reaction between NaDCC and a dilute solution of copper (II) sulfate produces an intense lilac precipitate of the complex salt sodium copper dichloroisocyanurate. The reactions between dichloroisocyanurate salts (Na, K, Li, Ba, Ca) and transition metal salts (Ni, Cu, Cd) are described in patent US 3,055,889. The overall reaction is:

 CuSO4  +  4 Na(C3N3O3Cl2)  →  Na2[Cu(C3N3O3Cl2)4]  +  Na2SO4

Sodium dichloroisocyanurate reacts with concentrated (130 vol, 35%) hydrogen peroxide to create singlet oxygen which emits red light upon decomposition . 

It is considered hazardous according to OSHA 29 CFR 1910.1200. High level exposure can cause reactive airways dysfunction syndrome (RADS)

See also 
 Comet (cleanser)
 Dichloroisocyanuric acid (dichlor)
 Trichloroisocyanuric acid (trichlor)

References 

Disinfectants
Organochlorides
Sodium compounds
Bleaches
Triazines